Harold Grey (born December 20, 1971) is a former boxer who was the IBF super flyweight champion twice in the mid-1990s. He was born in Arjona, Bolívar, Colombia.

Pro career
Grey turned pro in 1990 and won his first 16 fights, setting up an IBF super flyweight title fight against Julio César Borboa in 1994.  Grey won very disputed split decision, and defended the belt three times before losing it to Carlos Gabriel Salazar by decision in 1995.  Grey regained the belt in a win over Salazar in a rematch in 1996, but lost the belt later that year when he was defeated by Danny Romero in two rounds.  Grey retired in 2004.

References

1971 births
Super-flyweight boxers
World boxing champions
World super-flyweight boxing champions
International Boxing Federation champions
Living people
People from Bolívar Department
Colombian male boxers